Ericka, or Éricka in France, is a girl's given name, a variant of Erica and Erika.

People with the name include:
 Ericka Bareigts (born 1967), French politician
 Ericka Beckman, American filmmaker
 Ericka Cruz (born 1981), Mexican beauty pageant titleholder
 Ericka Dunlap (born 1982), American beauty pageant titleholder
 Ericka Huggins (born 1948), American activist and educator
 Ericka Hunter, Canadian singer-songwriter
 Ericka Lorenz (born 1981), American water polo player
 Ericka Walker (born 1981), American artist
 Krissy & Ericka, a Philippine pop-acoustic music duo

References

 
Feminine given names